Wilkes may refer to:

Places
 Wilkes, Portland, Oregon, a US neighborhood
 Wilkes County, Georgia
 Wilkes County, North Carolina
 Wilkes Basin, George V Land, Antarctica
 Wilkes Station, Antarctica, a research station
 Battery Wilkes, a historic artillery battery in West Ashley, Charleston, South Carolina
 Wilkes Power Plant, Jefferson, Texas, an electrical power station

Schools in the United States
 Wilkes University, Pennsylvania
 Wilkes Community College, Wilkesboro, North Carolina
 Wilkes Honors College, Florida

People
 Wilkes (surname), people with the surname
 Wilkes Angel (1817–1889), New York lawyer and politician
 Wilkes C. Robinson (1925–2015), judge of the United States Court of Federal Claims from 1987 to 1997

Other uses
 , several US Navy vessels
 Wilkes (horse) (born 1952), Australian thoroughbred

See also 
 Wilk
 Wilken
 Wilkens
 Wilkes Land, Antarctica
 Clarie Coast, called Wilkes Coast in Australia
 Wilkes-Barre, Pennsylvania, a city
 Wilkes-Barre Township, Luzerne County, Pennsylvania
 Wilkes-Barre Variation, a chess opening
 Wilks (disambiguation)

Surnames from given names